Ronald 'Ronny' Louis Gaspercic (born 9 May 1969) is a Belgian retired footballer who played as a goalkeeper.

He is of Croatian descent.

Club career
Born in Genk, Gaspercic started his professional career with local K.R.C. Genk, then named FC Winterslag, being first-choice for six of his nine seasons. He then moved to modest K.R.C. Harelbeke, winning the Professional goalkeeper of the year award for the 1997–98 campaign; the club finished fifth and had the best defensive record in the league, only trailing to champions Club Brugge KV (29 goals to 31).

Gaspercic then had a seven-year spell in Spain, with CF Extremadura, Real Betis, Deportivo Alavés and Albacete Balompié, in both major divisions, being a starter for the first and the third teams. He returned home in 2005, playing still two more seasons with K.V.C. Westerlo and retiring at the age of 38.

International career
Gaspercic gained eight caps for Belgium between 1998 and 2001, while appearing consistently for Extremadura, but never appeared in any major tournament for the nation.

Notes

External links

1969 births
Living people
Belgian footballers
Association football goalkeepers
Belgian Pro League players
Challenger Pro League players
K.F.C. Winterslag players
K.R.C. Genk players
K.V.C. Westerlo players
La Liga players
Segunda División players
CF Extremadura footballers
Real Betis players
Deportivo Alavés players
Albacete Balompié players
Belgium international footballers
Belgian expatriate footballers
Expatriate footballers in Spain
Belgian expatriate sportspeople in Spain
K.R.C. Zuid-West-Vlaanderen players
Belgian people of Croatian descent
Sportspeople from Genk
Footballers from Limburg (Belgium)